The Maliki school is one of the four major schools of Islamic jurisprudence within Sunni Islam. It was founded by Malik ibn Anas in the 8th century. The Maliki school of jurisprudence relies on the Quran and hadiths as primary sources. Unlike other Islamic fiqhs, Maliki fiqh also considers the consensus of the people of Medina to be a valid source of Islamic law.

The Maliki school is one of the largest groups of Sunni Muslims, comparable to the Shafi`i madhhab in adherents, but smaller than the Hanafi madhhab. Sharia based on Maliki doctrine is predominantly found in North Africa (excluding northern and eastern Egypt), West Africa, Chad, Sudan, Kuwait, Bahrain, Qatar, the Emirate of Dubai (UAE), and in northeastern parts of Saudi Arabia.

In the medieval era, the Maliki school was also found in parts of Europe under Islamic rule, particularly Islamic Spain and the Emirate of Sicily. A major historical center of Maliki teaching, from the 9th to 11th centuries, was in the Mosque of Uqba of Tunisia.

History

Although Malik ibn Anas was himself a native of Medina, his school faced fierce competition for followers in the Muslim east, with the Shafi'i, Hanbali, and Zahiri schools all enjoying more success than Malik's school. It was eventually the Hanafi school, however, that earned official government favor from the Abbasids.

Imam Malik (who was a teacher of Imam Ash-Shafi‘i, who in turn was a teacher of Imam Ahmad ibn Hanbal) was a student of Imam Ja'far al-Sadiq (a descendant of the Islamic prophet Muhammad and 6th Shi'ite Imam), as with Imam Abu Hanifah. Thus all of the four great Imams of Sunni Fiqh are connected to Ja'far, whether directly or indirectly.

The Malikis enjoyed considerably more success in Africa, and for a while in Spain and Sicily. Under the Umayyads and their remnants, the Maliki school was promoted as the official state code of law, and Maliki judges had free rein over religious practices; in return, the Malikis were expected to support and legitimize the government's right to power. This dominance in Spanish Andalus from the Umayyads up to the Almoravids continued, with Islamic law in the region dominated by the opinions of Malik and his students. The Sunnah and Hadith, or prophetic tradition in Islam, played lesser roles as Maliki jurists viewed both with suspicion, and few were well versed in either. The Almoravids eventually gave way to the predominantly-Zahiri Almohads, at which point Malikis were tolerated at times but lost official favor. With the Reconquista, the Iberian Peninsula was lost to the Muslims in totality.

Although Al-Andalus was eventually lost, the Maliki has been able to retain its dominance throughout North and West Africa to this day. Additionally, the school has traditionally been the preferred school in the small Arab States of the Persian Gulf (Bahrain, Kuwait and Qatar). While the majority of the United Arab Emirates and Saudi Arabia follows Hanbali laws, the country's Eastern Province has been known as a Maliki stronghold for centuries.

Initially hostile to mystical practices, Malikis eventually learned to coexist with Sufi customs as the latter became widespread throughout North and West Africa. Many Muslims now adhere to both Maliki law and a Sufi order.

Principles
Maliki school's sources for Sharia are hierarchically prioritized as follows: Quran and then trustworthy Hadiths (sayings, customs and actions of Muhammad); if these sources were ambiguous on an issue, then `Amal (customs and practices of the people of Medina), followed by consensus of the Sahabah (the companions of Muhammad), then individual's opinion from the Sahabah, Qiyas (analogy), Istislah (interest and welfare of Islam and Muslims), and finally Urf (custom of people throughout the Muslim world if it did not contradict the hierarchically higher sources of Sharia).

The Mālikī school primarily derives from the work of Malik ibn Anas, particularly the Muwatta Imam Malik, also known as Al-Muwatta. The Muwaṭṭa relies on Sahih Hadiths, includes Malik ibn Anas' commentary, but it is so complete that it is considered in Maliki school to be a sound hadith in itself. Mālik included the practices of the people of Medina and where the practices are in compliance with or in variance with the hadiths reported. This is because Mālik regarded the practices of Medina (the first three generations) to be a superior proof of the "living" sunnah than isolated, although sound, hadiths. Mālik was particularly scrupulous about authenticating his sources when he did appeal to them, as well as his comparatively small collection of aḥādith, known as al-Muwaṭṭah (or, The Straight Path). The example of Maliki approach in using the opinion of Sahabah were recorded in Muwatta Imam Malik per ruling of cases regarding the law of consuming Gazelle meat. This tradition were used from opinion of Zubayr ibn al-Awwam. Malik also included the daily practice of az-Zubayr as his source of "living sunnah" (living tradition) for his guideline to pass verdicts for various matters, in accordance of his school of though method.

The second source, the Al-Mudawwana, is the collaborator work of Mālik's longtime student, Ibn Qāsim and his mujtahid student, Sahnun. The Mudawwanah consists of the notes of Ibn Qāsim from his sessions of learning with Mālik and answers to legal questions raised by Saḥnūn in which Ibn Qāsim quotes from Mālik, and where no notes existed, his own legal reasoning based upon the principles he learned from Mālik. These two books, i.e. the Muwaṭṭah and Mudawwanah, along with other primary books taken from other prominent students of Mālik, would find their way into the Mukhtaṣar Khalīl, which would form the basis for the later Mālikī madhhab.

Maliki school is most closely related to the Hanafi school, and the difference between them is more of a degree, rather than nature. However, unlike the Hanafi school, the Maliki school does not assign as much weight to analogy, but derives its rulings from pragmatism using the principles of istislah (public interest) wherever the Quran and Sahih Hadiths do not provide explicit guidance.

Notable differences from other schools
The Maliki school differs from the other Sunni schools of law most notably in the sources it uses for derivation of rulings. Like all Sunni schools of Sharia, the Maliki school uses the Qur'an as primary source, followed by the sayings, customs/traditions and practices of Muhammad, transmitted as hadiths. In the Mālikī school, said tradition includes not only what was recorded in hadiths, but also the legal rulings of the four rightly guided caliphs – especially Umar.

Malik bin Anas himself also accepted binding consensus and analogical reasoning along with the majority of Sunni jurists, though with conditions. Consensus was only accepted as a valid source of law if it was drawn from the first generation of Muslims in general, or the first, second or third generations from Medina, while analogy was only accepted as valid as a last resort when an answer was not found in other sources.

Notable Mālikīs
 Ibn Abd al-Hakam (d. 829), one of the Egyptian scholars who developed the Maliki school in Egypt 
Asbagh ibn al-Faraj (d. 840), Egyptian scholar 
Yahya al-Laithi (d. 848), Andalusian scholar, introduced the Maliki school in Al-Andalus
 Sahnun (AH 160/776–77 – AH 240/854–55), Sunnī jurist and author of the Mudawwanah, one of the most important works in Mālikī law 
 Abd al-Malik ibn Habīb (AH 174/790-241/853), a prominent student of the direct students of Imām Mālik. He collected the opinions of Imām Mālik and his students in his al-Wādiḥah, which is one of the most important works in Mālikī law and the main authoritative book on Mālikī law in al-Andalus and the Maghrib.
 Ibn Abi Zayd (310/922–386/996), Tunisian Sunnī jurist and author of the Risālah, a standard work in Mālikī law
 Yusuf ibn abd al-Barr (978–1071), Andalusian scholar
 Ibn Tashfin (1061–1106), one of the prominent leaders of the Almoravid dynasty
 Qadi Ayyad (d. 1149), a great Imam and Qadi in Maliki jurisprudence
 Ibn Rushd (Averroes) (1126–1198), philosopher and scholar
 Al-Qurtubi (1214–1273)
 Shihab al-Din al-Qarafi (1228–1285), Moroccan jurist and author who lived in Egypt
 Khalil ibn Ishaq al-Jundi (d. ca. 1365), Egyptian jurist, author of Mukhtasar
 Ibn Battuta (February 24, 1304 – 1377), explorer
 Ibn Khaldūn (1332/AH 732–1406/AH 808), scholar, historian and author of the Muqaddimah
 Abu Ishaq al-Shatibi (d. 1388), a famous Andalusian Maliki jurist
 Sidi Boushaki (d. 1453), a famous Algerian Maliki jurist
 Sidi Abd al-Rahman al-Tha'alibi (d. 1479), a famous Algerian Maliki jurist

Contemporary Malikis

 Usman dan Fodio (1754–1817), founder of the Sokoto Caliphate
 El Hadj Umar Tall (1794–1864), founder of the Toucouleur Empire
 Emir Abdelkader (1808–1883), Algerian sufi and politician, religious and military leader who led a struggle against the French colonial invasion
 Ahmad al-Alawi (1869–1934), Algerian Sufi leader
 Omar Mukhtar (1862–1931), Libyan resistance leader
 Abdallah bin Bayyah (born 1935), Mauritanian professor of Islamic Legal Methodology at King Abdulaziz University
 Muhammad Ibn 'Abd al-Karim al-Khattabi, Moroccan resistance leader
 Abu-Abdullah Adelabu
 Sherman Jackson
 Abdalqadir as-Sufi (1930–2021), Scottish shaykh and founder of the Murabitun World Movement
 Hamza Yusuf (born 1958), American scholar and co-founder of Zaytuna College
 Suhaib Webb
Abdullahi Aliyu Sumaila
 Ahmed Saad Al-Azhari, British Islamic scholar and a graduate of Al-Azhar university. Saad was formerly a Shafi’i before adopting the Maliki school
 Muḥammad al Tahir ibn Ashur (1879-1973) Tunisian Islamic Scholar and Shariah Judge

See also

 Outline of Islam
 Glossary of Islam
 List of Islamic scholars
 The Seven Fuqaha of Medina
 Malikism in Algeria
 Adhan
 Islamic views on sin

References

Citation

Further reading 
 Cilardo, Agostino (2014), Maliki Fiqh, in Muhammad in History, Thought, and Culture: An Encyclopedia of the Prophet of God (2 vols.), Edited by C. Fitzpatrick and A. Walker, Santa Barbara, ABC-CLIO
 Chouki El Hamel (2012), Slavery in Maliki School in the Maghreb, in Black Morocco: A History of Slavery, Race, and Islam, Cambridge University Press, 
 Thomas Eich (2009), Induced Miscarriage (Abortion) in Early Maliki and Hanafi Fiqh, Islamic Law & Society, Vol. 16, pp. 302–336
 Janina Safran (2003), Rules of purity and confessional boundaries: Maliki debates about the pollution of the Christian, History of religions, Vol. 42 No. 3, pp. 197–212
 FH Ruxton (1913), The Convert's Status in Maliki Law, The Muslim World, Vol 3, Issue 1, pp. 37–40,

External links
 Partial Translation of Mālik's Al-Muwaṭṭah University of Southern California
 Malikiyyah Bulend Shanay, Lancaster University
 Biographical summary of Imam Mālik
 Al-Risalah of 'Abdullah ibn Abi Zayd al-Qayrawani 10th century Maliki text on Islamic law, Translated by Aisha Bewley
 French translations of a variety of important Mālikī source texts 

 
Madhhab
Schools of Sunni jurisprudence
Sunni Islamic branches
Sunni Islam